The largescale mullet (Planiliza macrolepis) is a species of fish in the family Mugilidae. It is found in the Indo-Pacific.

Description
The largescale mullet is greenish-grey above and silvery grey beneath. The fins are bluish-grey with darker edges. The top of the back is nearly straight when viewed from the side while the underside is rounded. The first dorsal fin has 4-5 spines with 8 or 9 soft rays and the anal fin has 3 spines with about 9 soft rays.

Distribution
The largescale mullet is found in shallow coastal areas in the Indo-Pacific region including estuaries and water with low salinity.

References

External links
FishBase

Largescale mullet
Taxa named by Andrew Smith (zoologist)
Fish described in 1846